Vesperus jertensis is a species of brown coloured beetle in the family Vesperidae that is endemic to Spain.

References

External links
Image of Vesperus jertensis on Barcode of Life

Vesperidae
Beetles described in 1998
Endemic fauna of Spain
Beetles of Europe